Kseniya Pavlovna Zikunkova (born 2 February 1979) is a Belarusian biathlete. She competed at the 2002 Winter Olympics and the 2006 Winter Olympics.

References

External links
 

1979 births
Living people
Biathletes at the 2002 Winter Olympics
Biathletes at the 2006 Winter Olympics
Belarusian female biathletes
Olympic biathletes of Belarus
Universiade gold medalists for Belarus
Universiade medalists in biathlon
Universiade bronze medalists for Belarus
Competitors at the 2003 Winter Universiade
Competitors at the 2005 Winter Universiade